Salemi is a surname. Notable people with the surname include:

 Joseph Salemi, American jazz trombonist
 Prince Umberto, Count of Salemi, Italian military personnel
 Silvia Salemi, Italian singer-songwriter and television personality

See also
 Salem (name)

Iranian-language surnames
Patronymic surnames
Surnames from given names